Cavalier Soccer Club is a Jamaican football club based in Kingston, which currently plays in the Jamaica National Premier League.

The team is based in Kingston, Jamaica, with their home ground at the Stadium East Field.

History
Cavalier were founded on 1 August 1962 by the late Leighton Duncan and were then also known as the Duncan Destroyers. They won the Jamaica National Premier League title once, in 1981. They were relegated in 1995.
This club is known for producing top quality youth teams and has won over 40 domestic titles.

Recent seasons
The club returned to the Jamaica National Premier League in 2012, after a 17-year hiatus and ended the season in mid-table.

Players

Current squad

Other players under contract

Notable former players 

 Kaheem Parris
 Alex Marshall
 Nicholas Hamilton

Honors

Senior Team

National Premier League

2 titles: 1980–81, 2021

Cavalier FC Achievement Youth

International

2019-Cayman U15 Invitational Champion

2019-Sweden-World Youth Cup-Gothia Cup-2nd round qualifier

2018-Sweden-World Youth Cup – Gothia Cup Tipselit – B Final - 2nd Place

2018-Cayman U13 Invitational - 2nd Place

2017-Cayman U15 Invitational - 3rd Place

2016-Cayman U15 Invitational - Champion

2019-Mexico U15 Copa Celta – beat top Mexican club Atlas in prelims

Local

KSAFA Under 13	

2018-KSAFA KO Champ

2015-KSAFA Champion
           
2014-KSAFA Champion
            
2013-KSAFA Champion
              
2012-KSAFA Champion
	           
2011-KSAFA Champion

2010-KSAFA Runner-Up
	           
2009-KS AFA Champion
	
Under 15

2019-KSAFA Champion

2018-KSAFA Champion

2015 - KSAFA Champion

2013-KSAFA 2nd Place

2010-KSAFA Champion

2009-KSAFA Champion

2008-KSAFA Champion

UNDER 17

2019-KSAFA U17 Runner-Up

2018-KSAFA-U17 Runner-Up

2017-KSAFA Champion

2015-KSAFA Champion

2013-KSAFA Champion

2011-KSAFA Champion

2010-KSAFA – Champion

KSAFA Under 20

2015-KSAFA-3rd Place

Players on the Jamaica Teams
The Jamaica U17 team that qualified for the 2011 world had 8 players from the Cavalier Soccer Club in the squad.
All 8 players played against France in a 1–1 tie at the World Cup which is a record achievement from any club in the world. https://www.youtube.com/watch?v=Kf__y5Mo0sQ

Jamaica U17-2011-Jason Wright, Patrick Palmer, Romario Williams, Romario Jones,
			Oshane Jenkins, Nico Campbell, Zhelano Barnes, Andre Lewis

Jamaica U 17-2012-Ryan Miller, Jahmarley Thomas, Alando Brown, Courtney Dowdie

Jamaica U20-2013-Romario Jones, Mark Brown, Nico Campbell, David Mitchell, Tavares Thompson, Zhelano Barnes

Jamaica U15-2013-Krishna Clarke, Jevaughn McKellar, Justin McMaster

Jamaica U17-2014-Alex Marshall, Hakim Williams, Ajeanie Talbott, Jahwanni Hinds

Jamaica U21-2014-Chevonne Marsh, Oshane Jenkins, David Mitchell

Jamaica U17-2016-Kaheem Parris, Jahmoi Topey, Nickache Murray, Omar Thompson, Jeadine White, Javon Francis, Nicque Daley

Jamaica U15-2017-Dwayne Atkinson, Isaac Scott, Dwayne Allen, Khalifah Richards, Okeefe Cunningham, Tyrese Durrant

Jamaica u20-2019-Kaheem Parris, Nicque Daley, Tevin Rochester, Jamoi Topey, Jeadine White, Clifton Woodbine

Jamaica u17-2019-Dwayne Atkinson, Isaac Scott, Hassani Barnes, Rajay Wright, Dandre Miller

Jamaica-U23-Alex Marshall, Nicque Daley, Jamoi Topey, Sheldon Mckoy

Jamaica Senior Team-Chevonne Marsh, Alex Marshall, Kaheem Parris, Jamoi Topey, Jeadine White

Individual Achievements

2019-Kaheem Parris signed to NK Domzale-Europe Slovenia – Priva Liga

2019-Jamoi Topey signed to Philadelphia Union=USA-USL League

2019-Nicque Daley signed to Charleston Battery-USA-USL League

2019-Rojay Nelson-invited to Philadelphia Union Academy USA

2019-Jhamar Brown-leadintg goalscorer Cayman U15 Invitational

2019-Xavier Codlin-MVP Cayman U15 invitational

2018-Christopher Ainsworth and Nathaniel Brooks sent to Barcelona Spain to train

2018-Christopher Ainsworth-MVP KSAFA U13 KO

2018-Jhamar Brown-leading goalscorer Cayman U13 invitational

2016-Chevonne Marsh-Kokkolan Palloveik – Finland Div 2

2016-Cavalier becomes the only KSAFA team to win the U13, U15, U17 titles in the same year

2015-Chevonne Marsh-Ventura Fusion-USA-USL league 2

2017-Kaheem Parris became the youngest ever senior international for Jamaica.

2017-Chevonne Marsh and Alex Marshall made their debut as Senior Jamaica team players.

2017-Jeadine White goalkeeper at 16 led Cavalier to Premier league promotion

2017-Dwayne Atkinson was named to the Concacaf All Star U15  team

2016-Kemali Green recruited to Philadelphis Union Academy USA

2016-Cavalier beat Totenham Hotspur(UK) in the finals of the Cayman U14 Invitational

2015-KSAFA U 20 leading goalscorer-Nicholas Hamilton

2015-KSAFA U17 leading goalscorer Alex Marshall

2015-KSAFA U17 MVP-Alex Marshall

2015-KSAFA U15 leading goalscorer-Michael Allen

2015-KSAFA U15 MVP-Jeadine White

2015-KSAFA U13 leading goalscorer-Revaldo Mitchell

2015-KSAFA U13 MVP –Dwayne Atkinson

2014-Caribbean Football Union  U17 MVP-Alex Marshall Cavalier

2014-Philadelphia Union MLS  recruited Ryan Miller Cavalier into their academy

2014-JFF appoints Cavalier coaches-Lamar Morgan &Toni Cowan to the Jamaica U15

2014-KSAFA U13 MVP-Michael Allen

2014-KSAFA U13 leading goalscorer-Michael Allen

2014-Digicel Kick start player-Alex Marshall

2014-Cavalier became the 2nd team to win the KSAFA U13, U15 and U17 in the same year

2013-KSAFA U13 leading goalscorer-Michael Allen

2013-KSAFA U15 leading goalscorer-Tevin Rochester

2013-KSAFA U17 leading goalscorer-Sheldon Mckoy

2012 -Digicel Kick Start selectees-Chevon Crooks & Kevon Deacon

2012-KSAFA U13 leading goalscorer-Tevin Rochester

2012-KSAFA U 13 MVP Matthew Wilson

2011–Digicel Kick start selectee- Kendon Anderson

2011-KSAFA U17 leading goalscorer Chevonne Marsh

2011-KSAFA U17 MVP Chevonne Marsh

2011-KSAFA U13 leading goalscorer Krishna Clarke

2011-KSAFA U13 MVP Clyde Ottey

2010-KSAFA U13 leading goalscorer –Sheldon Mckoy

2010-KSAFA U17 MVP Conroy Johnson

2010-KSAFA U17 leading goalscorer-Michaelous Martin

2009-Real MADRID Academy had Jason Wright and Patrick Palmer

2009-KSAFA U15 MVP Patrick Palmer

2009-KSAFA U13 MVP Jordan James

2008-KSAFA U15 MVP Conroy Johnson

Cavalier Achievements Senior

2011-2012 -Qualified for the National Premier League

2010 - Won KSAFA Super League; Won Under 17 Confederation (KSAFA); Finalist- Jackie Bell Knockout Competition

2009 - Won Under 15 Confederation League ( KSAFA); Won Under 13 Confederation League (KSAFA); Super League Runner-up; Winner of Fair Play Award

2008 - Won Under 15 Confederation League ( KSAFA)

2006 - Promoted to Super League Runner-up Major League

2001 - Finalist in Syd Bartlett League Promoted to Major League

1994 - Semi-finalist in National Premier League

1993 - Published “Call of the Ball’” as part of 30th anniversary celebrations

1992 - Third in National Premier League

1989 - Third in President’s Cup Finalist in Parish Knockout Competition – Umoja

1988 - Fourth in National Premier League

1986 - Finalist in Parish League

1985 - Third in National Premier League Fourth in President’s Cup

1984 - Third in National Premier League

1983 - Finalist in Parish League Cavalier Top Goal Scorer of Competition

1980 - Finalist in Parish League – Major League (competition abandoned) Won National Club League

1979 - Second in National Club League Finalist in Parish League – Major League Finalist in Parish Knockout Competition – Umoja Founder of Cavalier awarded National Honour – Order of Distinction

1978 - Won Parish League – Major League Joint Winners JFF Knockout Competition – President’s Cup

1977 - Won Parish Knockout Competition – Umoja Cup

1976 - Second in National Club League

1975 - Second in National Club League

1974 - Won Parish League – Major League

1973 - Did not participate in Parish League

1972 - Won National Knockout Competition – Ovaltine Did not participate in Parish League

1971 - Host to Santos of Brazil and Chelsea of England Cavalier International XI commemoration of Santos-Chelsea Tournament Won Parish Division I Championship – Arthur McKenzie Cup. Won Juvenile All-Island Knockout Championship – Alcan Trophy

1969 - Track and Field athletic section of Club established. Promoted initial Annual Athletic Meet for schoolgirls

1968 - Hosts of Detroit Cougars Soccer Club of the North American League. Cavalier squad toured Haiti.

1967 - Won Juvenile All-Island Knockout Championship – Alcan Trophy Won Homelectrix Knockout Championship Cavalier player voted “Most Outstanding Player” in Homelectrix Tournament

1966 - Won Booker Challenge Trophy Cavalier Squad toured Bermuda Cavalier Coaching School established. In conjunction with JFF, conducted Coaching Clinic for coaches.

1965 - Won Division I Championship – Arthur McKenzie Cup Cavalier Player awarded “Player of the Year” award – Diamond Soccer Awards Cavalier Player awarded “Most Improved Player” award.

1964- Won All-Island Knockout Championship – Ovaltine Trophy Cavalier Coach awarded “Coach of the Year” award – Diamond Soccer Award

1963 - Won “Most Sparkling Team” award – Diamond Soccer Awards

1962 - Won Division II and Junior Knockout Championships – unbeaten

References

External links
 Club profile – KSAFA
 Cavalier celebrating 50 years of football – Jamaica Gleaner

Football clubs in Jamaica
Association football clubs established in 1962
1962 establishments in Jamaica